The 1936 Kansas gubernatorial election was held on November 3, 1936. Democratic nominee Walter A. Huxman defeated Republican nominee Will G. West with 51.09% of the vote.

Primary elections
Primary elections were held on August 4, 1936.

Democratic primary

Candidates
Walter A. Huxman, former Kansas State Tax Commissioner
Jonathan M. Davis, former Governor

Results

General election

Candidates
Major party candidates 
Walter A. Huxman, Democratic
Will G. West, Republican

Other candidates
George M. Whiteside, Socialist

Results

References

1936
Kansas
Gubernatorial